JsPHP is a cross-browser JavaScript library designed to make the PHP application programming interface (API) available in JavaScript environments. It was started by Kevin van Zonneveld as php.js and released as an open-source project in 2008. In late 2011 John Elliot forked the php.js project to JsPHP and released a web-based collaborative integrated development environment (IDE) at www.jsphp.com in an effort to rejuvenate and breathe new life into the project, and as an excuse to develop a content management system (CMS) with features for software developers, such as unit testing and benchmarking.

JsPHP is free, open source software, dual-licensed under the MIT License or the GNU General Public License, Version 2. JsPHP is designed to provide a familiar and powerful programming interface for JavaScript programmers with a background in, or integrating with, PHP. JsPHP is a useful supplement to other JavaScript libraries and can be used in Ajax applications and dynamic web pages and web applications.

Etymology 

The 'js' in JsPHP is short for JavaScript and the 'PHP' stands for PHP: Hypertext Preprocessor. As with many software projects  the name JsPHP was taken because a domain name, www.jsphp.com, was available; and the name is otherwise concise and descriptive.

Features 

JsPHP has support for the vast majority of the PHP API, including functions for array, math, class/object manipulation, date and time, error handling and logging, filesystem, function handling, JSON, regular expressions, streams, strings, tokenization, URLs and XML.

Including the library 

The JsPHP library is only available in custom packages. This means a software developer selects the functions they need and a JsPHP library file is compiled with the selected functions and their dependencies. Functions are also available for individual download. Downloads can be in one of two classes, either "production code" (which has been specifically flagged as fit for release) and "development code" (which is the latest available code in the repository).

Developing at www.jsphp.com 

The JsPHP library is developed at www.jsphp.com, which provides a CMS and IDE for development and testing of the software. Of particular note are the built-in code editing, unit testing and benchmarking facilities. The unit testing facility is built on the QUnit library, part of the jQuery project.

See also 

 Comparison of JavaScript frameworks
 jQuery UI
 jQuery Mobile

References

External links
 
 Upstream source
 ProgClub, the project administrators

JavaScript libraries
Ajax (programming)
Software using the MIT license
2011 software